Mount Houghton is a 10,490-foot-elevation mountain summit located in Washoe County, Nevada, United States.

Description
Mount Houghton is set seven miles north of Lake Tahoe in the Mount Rose Wilderness, on land managed by the Humboldt-Toiyabe National Forest. It is the highest point of Relay Ridge, second-highest peak within the wilderness, and ranks as the seventh-highest peak of the Carson Range, which is a subset of the Sierra Nevada. The Tahoe Rim Trail traverses the southern base of the peak, providing an approach option.

Etymology
This landform's toponym was officially adopted in 1988 by the U.S. Board on Geographic Names to remember Dr. John Greenleaf Houghton (1940–1979), professor of geography at the University of Nevada, Reno. He was one of 257 people who perished November 29, 1979, when Air New Zealand Flight 901 flew into Mount Erebus on Ross Island, Antarctica, killing all 237 passengers and 20 crew on board.

Climate
According to the Köppen climate classification system, Mount Houghton is located in an alpine climate zone. Most weather fronts originate in the Pacific Ocean, and travel east toward the Sierra Nevada mountains. As fronts approach, they are forced upward by the peaks (orographic lift), causing them to drop their moisture in the form of rain or snowfall onto the range. Most of the snow in Nevada falls from December through March.

See also
 List of Lake Tahoe peaks

Gallery

References

External links
 Weather forecast: Mount Houghton
 John G. Houghton: Wikidata

Mountains of Washoe County, Nevada
Mountains of Nevada
Humboldt–Toiyabe National Forest
North American 3000 m summits
Mountains of the Sierra Nevada (United States)